Pilar Delgado (born María del Pilar Delgado Peregrino on March 15, 1966, in Mexico City, Mexico) is a Mexican actress model and dancer.

Delgado she a daughter of Gynecologist & Obstretician Miguel Delgado Contreras. She attended the INBA (National Institute for Arts) in Mexico, studied classical & contemporary dance. Later, she began her acting career on TV and participated in several sit-coms for Televisa.

Filmography

Films
La mafia tiembla (1986)
Agente 0013: Hermelinda Linda 2 (1986)
Durazo, la verdadera historia (1988)
El mil hijos (1989)
El día de las sirvientas (1989)

Television
Las aventuras de Cerebrón y sus amigos (1983)
Soltero en el aire (1984)
Salón de belleza (1985)
Mi secretaria as Pilar (1985)
Las aventuras de Lenguardo (1985)
Hospital de la risa as Nurse Pilar (1986)
Nosotros los Gómez (1988)

Theatre
El Don Juan Tenorio (1982-1989)

Club nocturno
Show de Luis de Alba
Show de Pompín Iglesias
Show de Joaquín García "Borolas"
Show de Sergio D´Fasio
Show de Isabel Martínez "La Tarabilla"

References

External links 
 
 
Página personal (español)

1966 births
Living people
Mexican television actresses
Mexican film actresses
Mexican stage actresses
Mexican female dancers
Actresses from Mexico City
20th-century Mexican actresses
21st-century Mexican actresses
People from Mexico City